Wet floor may refer to:

 Wet floor sign
 Wet floor effect